Dato' Dr. Ibrahim bin Ali (Jawi: إبراهيم بن علي; born 25 January 1951) is a Malaysian politician. He is informally known as Tok Him. He served as the Member of Parliament (MP) for Pasir Mas from August 1986 to April 1995 and again from March 2008 to May 2013. He is a member of the Parti Bumiputera Perkasa Malaysia (PUTRA), a component party of the Gerakan Tanah Air (GTA) opposition coalition. He has served as the 1st and founding President of PUTRA since May 2019. He is also founding President of the Malay dominance organisation Pertubuhan Pribumi Perkasa (PERKASA).

Early life and education
Ibrahim was born on 25 January 1951 in Kampung Pasir Pekan, Tumpat, Kelantan. He is the fifth child and eldest boy of 13 children. His father, Ali Mohamad @ Che Leh was the village head.

He studied in different primary schools. First it was Sekolah Kebangsaan Padang Mandul, then Sekolah Kebangsaan Pasir Pekan, and then an English primary school in another district, Tanah Merah as was sent to live with his uncle because his parents unable support a big family. He spent my secondary school years in Sekolah Kebangsaan Islah and did Lower and Upper Six in a private school, Maktab Abadi, where he live underneath the school and would work part-time while studying when he couldn’t afford the fees. After completed his high school certificate (HSC), he signed up to do a Bachelor of Laws (LLB) in Institut Teknologi Mara (ITM, now Universiti Teknologi MARA, UiTM)), but later switched his course to mass communications instead.

He has obtained his Doctor of Philosophy (PhD) from IIC University of Technology, Cambodia later of his life in 2017.

Political career
Ibrahim prior to political involvement was a student activist in his younger days at the tertiary institution and had later joined Pan-Malaysian Islamic Front (BERJASA).. He first elected to Parliament in the 1986 general election for the Pasir Mas seat in Kelantan representing the United Malay National Organisation (UMNO) of the then ruling Barisan Nasional (BN) coalition. 

However, he later left the party alongside others and joined the UMNO-breakaway Parti Melayu Semangat 46 (Semangat 46) and successfully defended the seat in the 1990 Malaysian general election. In 1991, he rejoined UMNO but lost his seat to the Semangat 46 candidate in the 1995 general election. He was again the UMNO candidate for the Pasir Mas seat in the 1999 Malaysian general election and as an independent candidate in the 2004 Malaysian general election. He was unable to win the seat in both elections. 

Ibrahim also contested as Independent in the 2005 Pengkalan Pasir by-election but lost in the three-cornered fight. In the 2008 general election, he successfully contested for the Pasir Mas seat on the banner and endorsement of the Pan-Malaysian Islamic Party (PAS). However, Ibrahim subsequently fell out with PAS, and sat as an independent in parliament and indicated a willingness to support the BN government. He again lost his seat as independent to newcomer Nik Mohamad Abduh Nik Abdul Aziz of PAS despite BN's decision to not field a candidate for the seat in the 2013 general election. In the 2018 general election, he contested again as independent candidate but lost.

Ibrahim founded a new party; PUTRA in 2019 after the downfall of BN government in the 2018 Malaysian general election and became the party's first president.

Perkasa
After the 2008 Malaysian general election, Ibrahim has founded Perkasa, a non-governmental organisation (NGO) and pressure group for Malay rights, which has taken a hardline stance against what they perceive to be infringements on Malay rights. Ibrahim and the NGO has been notorious for making baseless and controversial statements against non-Malay and non-Muslim groups in Malaysia. The group opposes abolition of the 30% ownership quota for Bumiputera citizens in government projects allocation. Claiming that the ethnic Chinese were dominating the Malaysian economy, Ibrahim said that the Chinese should not be too greedy and symphathise with the Malay population who still lagged behind in certain areas.

Ibrahim has resigned twice as Perkasa president, once in 2013 and again in 2018. Both resignations were rejected by the Perkasa Supreme Council.

The NGO has been considered the origin of formation of Ibrahim's new party PUTRA later after the 2018 Malaysian general election in 2019.

Controversies

Interview with Al Jazeera 
During an interview with Al Jazeera English, Ibrahim denied that non-Malays were being unfairly treated in Malaysia, but emphasised instead that Malays have "sacrificed a lot of [their] interest." The interview was noted for his use of the word "Shit" three times which was bleeped out during the broadcast.

Mocking of Karpal Singh 
During a 2008 parliamentary sitting, he mocked Democratic Action Party (DAP) chairman and Bukit Gelugor MP, Karpal Singh for not being able to stand while speaking. He received furious comments from opposition politicians as Karpal is disabled and was forced to make an apology which in it he promised not to stand up in Parliament for a whole month.

Sexist remarks on Malaysian wives 
In April 2011, he made perceived sexist remarks in Parliament, blaming "wives who neglect their responsibilities" for Malaysian men having extramarital sex.

"Nerf war" on Christian 
In May 2011, following the controversy over an alleged plot by Christians in Malaysia to supplant Islam as the official religion in Malaysia which was reported by Utusan Malaysia, Ibrahim threatened to wage "Nerf war" against Christians.

Bersih 2.0 rally 
In June 2011, he allegedly warned the community not to turn up in support of the 2011 Bersih 2.0 rally, saying that if chaos erupts, "I believe the Chinese community will have to stock up on food." The remark was perceived as racially charged, with UMNO Youth leader Khairy Jamaluddin calling Ibrahim a racist. Ibrahim later claimed he was merely giving an advice, but being misunderstood as giving a threat to the ethnic Chinese community. Despite promising earlier to bring 15 thousand Perkasa supporters to counter the Bersih rally, he was nowhere to be seen on the day. He later claimed that he was unwell and did not get his wife's permission to attend the counter rally.

"White ang pow" incident 
In January 2012 during an event celebrating the Chinese New Year, in an incident which has come to be known as "white ang pow", he distributed small monetary gifts that were contained within white envelopes instead of red ones. White ang pows are customarily handed out only at funerals. Some described the choice of colour a deliberate attempt to remind the Chinese community. However, a spokesman said rather than turning away the greater than expected number of guests empty handed, white envelopes were used when they ran out of red ones.

Seize and burn Bible containing the word "Allah" 
In January 2013, he has called on Muslims to seize and burn copies of Bibles which contain the term “Allah” or other Arabic religious words. At least a dozen police reports have been made against him as a result of his actions, but despite the clearly seditious nature of his statement, the authorities have so far been reluctant to press charges. This has led the public to accuse the government of selective prosecution, as Ibrahim Ali is known to be aligned towards the ruling UMNO-BN party.

Chin Peng's remains 
In September 2013 Ibrahim Ali expressed protest and opposed any attempts to bring the remains of the former secretary-general of the Malayan Communist Party, Chin Peng back to Malaysia. He said that he will never allow Chin Peng to return to Malaysian regardless whether he is alive or dead. He also said any record of Chin Peng should be erased from the annals of the country's history and kept from the eyes of the younger generation, adding that Chin Peng's remains should be "tossed into the air". Perkasa secretary-general Syed Hassan Syed Ali warned Malaysian Chinese Association (MCA) not to upset the Malays by insisting that the Malaysian government should allow Chin Peng's remains to be brought back to Malaysia.

Bumiputera Economic Empowerment Plan 
16 September 2013, Ibrahim Ali insisted that RM 1.4 trillion was needed to assist Prime Minister of Malaysia Datuk Seri Najib Razak's RM31bil Bumiputera Economic Empowerment Plan (BEEP) to increase economic status of the Malay.

On 6 October 2013 Ibrahim Ali has warned of another race riot if the majority of the Foreign Labour remained in poverty, praising Najib Razak of making the right decision by implementing the new RM31bil BEEP intended to increase the economic status of the Malays. He said that the 13 May riots occurred because the Malays were not satisfied. Many critics say that the programme has further entrenched race-based policies and inhibit Malaysia's economic competitiveness which then results in a huge brain drain of many non-Malays.

Banning of Malay language bible 
On 17 October 2013, Ibrahim Ali urged Prime Minister Najib Razak to ban the Malay language bible in Malaysia, commenting that the government had been too compromising and give in to the demands of the Christians in Malaysia as they are not satisfied enough because the Christians insisted on using the word "Allah" in the bible, which he claims that "Allah" can only be used by Muslims in Malaysia. He added that the Malays had been "trodden and spat on" by "ungrateful Christians" and demanded the government to ban the Malay language bible as a retaliation. He resorted to name-calling by describing DAP Secretary General Lim Guan Eng as a "pig" for defending the Christians right to use the word "Allah" in the bible. He also mocked the Christians saying that the Christians insisted that they use the word "Allah" because they had no name for their own God.

Contempt of court 
On 19 November 2013, Ibrahim Ali was fined RM20,000 and jailed one day by the High Court of Kuala Lumpur after being held in contempt of court over an article in the Perkasa website which made disparaging remarks about Justice VT Singam, who had presided over a defamation suit in which opposition leader Anwar Ibrahim had successfully claimed damages for libel against the pro-establishment mouthpiece Utusan Malaysia. The author of the offending article was sentenced to four weeks' jail.

Election results

Honour

Honours of Malaysia
 :
  Companion Class I of the Exalted Order of Malacca (DMSM) – Datuk (1994)
 :
  Knight Commander of the Order of the Crown of Selangor (DPMS) – Dato' (1999)
 :
  (2003, revoked 2010)

See also

 Pasir Mas (federal constituency)
 Pertubuhan Pribumi Perkasa 
 Parti Bumiputera Perkasa Malaysia

References

1951 births
Living people
People from Kelantan
Malaysian people of Malay descent
Malaysian Muslims
Malaysian conspiracy theorists
Malaysian political party founders
Leaders of political parties in Malaysia
Pan-Malaysian Islamic Front politicians
Former United Malays National Organisation politicians
Parti Melayu Semangat 46 politicians
Former Malaysian Islamic Party politicians
Independent politicians in Malaysia
Members of the Dewan Rakyat
Members of the Dewan Negara
21st-century Malaysian politicians
Knights Commander of the Order of the Crown of Selangor